S Zorinliana (born 28 November 1974) is an Indian cricketer. He made his List A debut on 28 September 2018, for Mizoram in the 2018–19 Vijay Hazare Trophy. He made his first-class debut on 20 November 2018, for Mizoram in the 2018–19 Ranji Trophy. He was the captain of Mizoram for the 2018–19 Ranji Trophy.

References

External links
 

1974 births
Living people
Indian cricketers
Mizoram cricketers
Place of birth missing (living people)